These are the Canadian number-one country songs of 1965, per the RPM Country Tracks chart.

See also
1965 in music

References

External links
 Read about RPM Magazine at the AV Trust
 Search RPM charts here at Library and Archives Canada

 
Canada Country
1965